Brother Liu and Brother Wang on the Roads in Taiwan (王哥柳哥遊台灣) is a Taiwanese two series movies comedy film directed by Li Xing.It was released on 7 February 1958

Brother Liu and Brother Wang on the Roads in Taiwan (王哥柳哥遊台灣) is a Taiwanese dialect comedy film directed by Li Xing, Zhang Fang Xia and Tian Feng.  It was released in 1959 as a two-part series. Part One was premiered on February 7, 1959. Part Two was premiered on February 19, 1959.

Plot  
Overweight shoeshiner Brother Wang (Wang Ge) and skinny rickshaw driver Brother Liu (Liu Ge) are best friends and roommates. One day, they come across a fortune teller who offers a peculiar forecast: that Wang will become very wealthy in three days but that Liu will die in 44 days.

When Wang strikes gold by winning the lottery, just as predicted, the celebratory mood is soon eclipsed by the reminder that Liu's death also has been forecast.  With his newfound wealth, Wang decides to reward his dying buddy with the trip of a lifetime. Carrying around a suitcase full of cash, the working-class twosome embark on a road trip around the beautiful island of Taiwan. Enjoying a lavish lifestyle as inexperienced big spenders, they find themselves in unexpected situations and amusing predicaments, one after another.

As the 44-day “deadline” approaches, Liu begins to feel ill and homesick. The two return to Taipei so that Liu can spend his last moments with his girlfriend A-hua. On the day of his anticipated death, a seemingly unwell Liu rests in his coffin at home, fully dressed and somberly waiting for his life to end. Many hours pass by, Liu becomes impatient and gets up to use the restroom, after which he feels much better. As midnight falls, it is obvious that Liu has been spared from death. The next day, Wong happily accompanies a lively and cheerful Liu on his way to get married with A-hua.

Home media

DVD

References

Films directed by Li Hsing
Taiwanese comedy films
1959 directorial debut films